Mustilia sphingiformis gerontica is a subspecies of moth in the family Endromidae. It was first described by West in 1932. It is found in Taiwan.

References

Moths described in 1932
Mustilia
Subspecies